Hamlin may refer to:

Places
 Hamlin, Iowa, a city
 Hamlin, Kansas, a city
 Hamlin, Kentucky, a town
 Hamlin, Maine, a town
 Hamlin, Michigan, a former community
 Hamlin, New York, a town
 Hamlin (CDP), New York, a census-designated place in the town
 Hamlin, Texas, a city
 Hamlin, West Virginia, a town
 Hamlin County, South Dakota
 Hamlin Township (disambiguation), several U.S. townships
 Hamlin Peak, on Mount Katahdin in Maine
 Hamlin Reservation, Massachusetts, a nature reserve
 Hamlin Valley, near the Nevada–Utah state line
 Hamlin, Alberta, Canada, an unincorporated community

People

Surname
Alan Hamlin (born 1951), British economist and political theorist
Catherine Hamlin (1924–2020), obstetrician and hospital founder
Charles Sumner Hamlin (1861–1938), American lawyer and politician, first Federal Reserve Chairman
Courtney W. Hamlin (1858–1950), U.S. Representative from Missouri
Cyrus Hamlin (general) (1839–1867), Civil War general
Cyrus Hamlin (1811–1900), missionary and educator
Damar Hamlin (born 1998), American football player
Denny Hamlin, (born 1980), American race car driver
Ebenezer Hamlin (1844–1900), New Zealand politician
Edward S. Hamlin (1808–1894), U.S. Representative from Ohio
Erin Hamlin (born 1986), American luger
Fanny Hamlin (born 1987), Swedish singer
Gene Hamlin (born 1946), National Football League center
Hannibal Hamlin (1809–1891), Vice President of the U.S. under Abraham Lincoln
Harry Hamlin (born 1951), American actor
Henry Hamlin (1484–1549/1550), English politician
Howland J. Hamlin (1850–1909), American lawyer
Jabez Hamlin (1709–1791), Connecticut politician and judge
Jean Hamlin (fl 1682–1684), French pirate 
John Austen Hamlin, co-originator with Lysander Hamlin of Hamlin's Wizard Oil
Ken Hamlin (born 1981), American football safety
Ken Hamlin (baseball) (born 1935), Major League Baseball infielder
Lawrence B. Hamlin, grandson of Lysander Hamilin and convicted of violating the U.S. 1906 Pure Food and Drug Act for claims about Hamlin's Wizard Oil
Luke Hamlin (1904–1978), Major League Baseball pitcher
Lysander Hamlin, co-originator with John Austen Hamlin of Hamlin's Wizard Oil
Rosie Hamlin (1945–2017), American singer and songwriter
Sally Hamlin (born 1902), child actor and recording artist
Shelley Hamlin (born 1949), American professional golfer
Simon M. Hamlin (1866–1939), U.S. Representative from Maine
V. T. Hamlin (1900–1993), creator of the comic strip Alley Oop
Walter B. Hamlin (1898–1984), Justice of the Louisiana Supreme Court

Given name
 Hamlin Garland (1860–1940), American writer
 Hamlin R. Harding (fl. 1860s–1870s), American politician

Other
 USS Hamlin, the name of two U.S. Navy ships: an escort carrier and a seaplane tender
 Hamlin, a variety of orange fruit
 Hamlin, an early maker of cable converter boxes

See also 
 Hamelin (disambiguation)
 Hamblin (disambiguation)
 Pied Piper of Hamelin

he:המלין (פירושונים)
ja:ハムリン